Antonio Ferro (born 17 March 1896, date of death unknown) was an Argentine footballer. He played in eight matches for the Argentina national football team in 1917 and 1918. He was also part of Argentina's squad for the 1917 South American Championship.

References

External links
 
 

1896 births
Year of death missing
Argentine footballers
Argentina international footballers
Place of birth missing
Association football defenders
Club Atlético Independiente footballers